Hussein Tawbe (born 16 July 1982) is a former Lebanese basketball player. Tawbe was a member of the Lebanon national basketball team, with whom he competed with at the 2006 FIBA World Championship and FIBA Asia Championship 2007. He previously played for Sporting Al Riyadi Beirut and Sagesse.

References

1982 births
Living people
Lebanese men's basketball players
Basketball players at the 2006 Asian Games
2006 FIBA World Championship players
Asian Games competitors for Lebanon
Sagesse SC basketball players
Al Riyadi Club Beirut basketball players